Zhao Liang is a circus performer from Henan in China.

Zhao played basketball until ligament damage to his left foot in 2001. His 2009 hospital trip related to this injury as he was too poor to have it treated sooner. He suffers of gigantism  Despite advising Zhao Liang against any intense physical exercise, Zhao's surgeon has declared that he has no health issues related to his height.  His parents and siblings are average height. 
He was unemployed until 2006, when he joined a circus in Jilin province.  Though recruited for his height, he now also does magic tricks and plays the saxophone and cucurbit flute.

See also
 List of tallest people

References

External links
 Story & Picture from the Daily Mirror

People from Henan
21st-century circus performers
1982 births
People with gigantism
Living people